Matti Juhani Viljanen (25 May 1937 – 4 May 2015) was a Finnish engineer and politician, born in  Lahti. He was a member of the Parliament of Finland from 1979 to 1991, representing the National Coalition Party.

References

1937 births
2015 deaths
People from Lahti
National Coalition Party politicians
Members of the Parliament of Finland (1979–83)
Members of the Parliament of Finland (1983–87)
Members of the Parliament of Finland (1987–91)